Pronoun reversal or pronominal reversal is when children refer to themselves as "he", "she", "they", or "you", or by their own proper name (pronoun avoidance). While it may signal an autism-spectrum disorder when it persists for an unusual length of time, some degree of pronoun confusion can occur as a part of allistic speech development, and it is common in toddlers.  Pronoun reversal is closely linked to echolalia: referring to themselves as they have heard others speak of them, resulting in the misapplication of pronouns.

For example:

Parent: What are you doing, Johnny?
Child: You're here.
Parent: Are you having a good time?
Child: You sure are.

As with many other autistic traits, if speech continues to develop more normally, this pronoun reversal might be expected to disappear. However, it can also be highly resistant to change. Some children require extensive training to stop pronoun reversal, even after they have stopped echolalia.

References 

 Tramontana & Stimbert, 1970 
 Davison, Neale & Kring, 2004

External links
 Gold, Kevin and Brian Scassellati, "Grounded Pronoun Learning and Pronoun Reversal", Yale University (2006)

Autism
Pronouns